This article incorporates text from the United States Government access site.

Spatial reconnaissance, or "space reconnaissance", is the reconnaissance of any celestial bodies in space by use of spacecraft and satellite photography.  NASA personnel utilize space reconnaissance to scout other planets, military uses space reconnaissance by using spy satellites onto the Earth's surface.  Space reconnaissance assets provide access to all parts of the globe and use a variety of sensors to collect information responsive to virtually every intelligence need.  They also constitute an integral part of the U.S. military force structure, providing critical information with sufficient accuracy and timeliness to support the maneuver of military forces and the targeting of their weapons.

Space reconnaissance is also very expensive. Although procured in limited numbers, the large satellite systems developed by the United States and the ground stations needed to operate them require expenditures in the range of several billions of dollars per year.  Their substantial cost puts great pressure on the Intelligence Community to search for alternatives, find efficiencies, and continuously scrutinize the intelligence requirements these systems address.

See also

 Reconnaissance satellite
 Aerial surveillance
 National Reconnaissance Office

Reconnaissance satellites
Spaceflight concepts
Surveillance